"Say What" is a single by LL Cool J from the hip-hop compilation, Violator: The Album. It was released on August 3, 1999 for Violator Records and Def Jam Recordings and featured production from Vinnie Biggs. In addition to Violator: The Album, "Say What" would also make an appearance on the Deep Blue Sea soundtrack, a film starring LL Cool J.

Track listing

A-side
"Say What" (Radio Edit)(LL Cool J) 
"First Degree" (Radio Edit) (Da Franchise, Ja Rule) 
"Violators" (Radio Edit) (Busta Rhymes, Noreaga, Prodigy, L. Boogie, Mysonne, Sonja Blade

B-side
"Say What" (Instrumental) 
"First Degree" (Instrumental) 
"Violators" (Instrumental)

References

1999 singles
1999 songs
LL Cool J songs
Def Jam Recordings singles
Songs written by LL Cool J